The Coast Guard Administration of the Ocean Affairs Council (CGA), also known as the Taiwan Coast Guard or R.O.C. Coast Guard, is charged with maintaining law and order, protecting the resources of the territorial waters of the Republic of China (Taiwan), which surrounds Taiwan, Penghu, Kinmen, Matsu Islands, Green Island, Orchid Island, Pratas Island (Tungsha/Dongsha), and Nansha Islands as well as providing a first line of defense along coastal areas against smugglers and illegal immigrants. The CGA is considered a civilian law enforcement agency under the administration of the Ocean Affairs Council of the Executive Yuan, though during emergencies it may be incorporated as part of the Republic of China Armed Forces.

The Coast Guard Administration is mainly composed of police officers, military personnel, and civilian civil servants.

Organization
The Coast Guard Administration is headed by one minister and three deputy ministers. The CGA includes eight departments, one office and five task forces, as well as a Maritime Patrol Directorate General and a Coastal Patrol Directorate General. Its jurisdiction covers the waters surrounding Kinmen, Matsu, Penghu, and the main island of Taiwan to ensure proper protection of the 1,819.8 kilometers coastline and 540,000 square kilometers of "Blue Territory," which is 15 times larger than the island of Taiwan.

Maritime Patrol Directorate General
The Maritime Patrol Directorate General is responsible for all maritime patrols and operations at sea. 
1 - 16th Offshore Flotillas
Northern, Southern, Central, and Eastern Flotilla Sectors

Coastal Patrol Directorate General
The Coastal Patrol Directorate General is responsible for land based operations, primarily the patrolling of harbors, beaches and other coastal areas.
Northern, Southern, Central, and Eastern Coastal Patrol Offices

Special Task Unit

The Special Task Unit is an elite special forces unit of the CGA similar to the Military Police Special Services Company or the National Police Agency's Thunder Squad. During the 36th annual Han Kuang exercises they participated alongside special operations units from other branches in anti-decapitation drills.

Scope
Article two of the Coast Guard Law splits the responsibilities of the CGA into three zones, their core area (Shoreline to the end of the Exclusive Economic Zone), Waters temporarily or tentatively within the area of law enforcement, and International waters fisheries patrol.

Core area
This includes all land within 500 meters of the high tide line, Territorial waters (extending 12 nm from shoreline), the Contiguous zone (extending 24 nm from shore), and the Exclusive Economic Zone (extending 200 nm from shore).

Waters temporarily or tentatively within the area of law enforcement
These are waters within the Exclusive Economic Zone (EEZ) were Taiwanese EEZs overlap with those of neighboring nations "where negotiations for delimitation have not yet reached a consensus."

International waters
The CGA conducts fisheries patrols in international waters, particularly the north and midwest Pacific Ocean.

History

The CGA was established on 1 February 2000, combining the Coast Guard Command (formerly under the Ministry of Defense), the Marine Police Bureau (formerly under the National Police Administration, Ministry of Interior), and several cutters from the Taiwan Directorate General of Customs, Ministry of Finance. The CGA formally unifies coastal and maritime law enforcement agencies.

It has seen a great deal of action for a young agency, participating in numerous search and rescue and anti-smuggling operations. The Coast Guard Administration was also recently involved in escorting Taiwanese fishing boats into waters disputed with Japan claimed by both sides as part of their exclusive economic zones.

In May 2019 the CGA detained two Chinese fishing vessels for illegally fishing inside Taiwan's territorial waters. One vessel was 0.4 nautical miles off Taiwanese shores while the other was 2.1 nautical miles offshore.

In May 2019 the CGA rescued six fishermen aboard a burning boat nineteen miles offshore. Five fisherman were picked up by cutter while the most seriously injured was airlifted to hospital by helicopter. All fishermen survived the ordeal although three required hospitalization.

On March 1, 2020, three coast guard cutters clearing illegal fishing nets off Little Kinmen island were attacked by Chinese fishing boats which had to be repelled with warning shots from a shotgun.

On March 16, 2020, the patrol boats CP-1022 and CP-2006 of the 9th Offshore Flotilla based on Kinmen were attacked by ten Chinese speedboats. They had been assisting a Kinmen County Government Fisheries Research Institute patrol boat in clearing fishing nets illegally left in Taiwanese waters by Chinese fishermen when they came under attack from the men in speedboats throwing rocks and bottles. During the incident CP-1022 was rammed at speed and lost the function of two of their three engines and its hull was damaged.  The CGA responded to the attack using less lethal means including stun grenades and bean bag rounds which caused the attacking boats to retreat.

In July 2020 the CGA arrested all 18 crew members of a Chinese fishing vessel caught fishing illegally in Taiwanese waters. The interdiction followed an increase in illegal fishing in Taiwanese waters by Chinese fishing vessels.

Between January and July 2020 the CGA chased 2,988 Chinese sand dredging vessels out of Taiwanese waters. In July 2020 the CGA seized a dredging vessel and arrested its eight crew as a warning to the rest.

In August 2020 the CGA detained a small Chinese oil tanker which had illegally entered Taiwan's waters. The oil tanker was discovered during enhanced COVID-19 pandemic biosecurity patrols.

In May 2021 the CGA detained a Chinese offshore supply vessel and its 12 crew. The vessel was caught trespassing in Taiwanese waters near Penghu. It is believed that the supply ship was being used to deliver food and other supplies to offshore fishing fleets.

In May 2022 an Anping-class patrol ship launched a Hsiung Feng II anti-ship missile for the first time in a joint exercise with the Navy.

Intelligence Function
Some people in Taiwan still regard the Coast Guard Administration as an intelligence agency due to its root. Indeed, the land branch of the Coast Guard Administration is inherited from the former Taiwan Garrison Command. As a result, a lot of intelligence personnel from the Military Police Command or the late Taiwan Garrison Command are still in the ROCCGA.

There are several mobile investigative groups subordinated to four corresponding areas of responsibility of the Coastal Patrol Directorate General. All mobile investigative groups of the Coast Guard Administration are tasked to perform intelligence-gathering mission of State Security. While executing such intelligence-gathering function, The Coast Guard Administration is subjected to the supervisory and coordination from the National Security Bureau.

International cooperation
The CGA cooperates with Japan, the Philippines, Malaysia, Thailand, Indonesia, and Vietnam in operations to counter human trafficking and drug smuggling. The CGA and the Japan Coast Guard conduct annual exercises and visits. The CGA and the Philippines Coast Guard have conducted tabletop exercises and drills. The CGA and the US Coast Guard cooperate on monitoring longline fishing, maritime law enforcement, human trafficking, and drug smuggling.

In 2010 the CGA held their first ever drill with China's Maritime Search and Rescue Center. The drill, which simulated a ferry disaster between Kinmen and Xiamen, included 14 vessels, 3 helicopters, and 400 personal. Due to the tense relations between the two countries participating forces used drill flags instead of their national flags and emblems. The second drill in 2012 involved 18 vessels and two helicopters from Taiwan, as well as 11 ships and one helicopter from China. A third drill in 2014 featured 33 vessels, four helicopters, and 550 personnel.

In 2020 the CGA and Chinese authorities worked out a standard operating procedure for dealing with illegal sand dredging by Chinese vessels. From implementation to December 2020 Chinese authorities had taken action in 64 cases and impounded 23 ships which demonstrated to the CGA that the Chinese were serious about cooperating on the issue.

In March 2021 the CGA and the US Coast Guard announced that they had signed a cooperation agreement, the agreement was promptly denounced by China. In May 2021 US President Joe Biden praised the cooperation agreement while speaking at the commencement of the United States Coast Guard Academy. The first bilateral meeting under the agreement occurred in August 2021.

Future of the CGA 
As of 2019 the CGA planned to construct a total of 141 ships, including four 4000-tonne, six 1000-tonne, 12 600-tonne, 17 100-tonne, 52 35-tonne patrol ships and 50 coastal multi-purposed ships, by 2027.

In 2021 the Taiwanese cabinet approved a NT$12.9 billion (US$428.53 million) budget for six new 3,000-ton class patrol vessels.

Fleet
In 2021 the CGA had more than 200 vessels.

In 2021 President Tsai Ing-wen ordered the name “Taiwan” to be prominently displayed on all vessels to avoid confusion with the People's Republic of China Coast Guard which is engaged in a grey-zone campaign against Taiwan and other neighboring countries.

Cutters and Patrol Boats

 RB-01 (Search/Rescue Boat)
 RB-02 (Search/Rescue Boat)
 RB-03 (Search/Rescue Boat)
 Type CP-1001 (Rubber raft) x9
 Type SF-801 (Speedboat) x6
 Type PP-601 (Speedboat) x9

Equipment

Helicopters and drones

 20 x AVIX AXH E320RS drone helicopters

Light weapons 

 Kestrel (rocket launcher), for Pratas and Spratley Islands garrisons. 292 deployed by April 2021.

naval gun

Multiple rocket system

Anti-ship missile

Coastal surveillance
The CGA maintains a comprehensive coastal surveillance network. In 2021 the CGA allocated NT$919.99 million (US$33.33 million) to upgrade its coastal surveillance network and to add new gap filler radars as well as photoelectric sensors to the network.

Rank insignia
Coast Guard Law Enforcement

Coast Guard Navigation and Engineering Officers
The navigation and engineering officers of the Taiwan coast guard cutters are not sworn law-enforcement officers. They wear the following rank insigna.

Leaders

Ministers (CGA under Executive Yuan)

Chairpersons (CGA under Ocean Affairs Council)

See also 

 China Coast Guard
 National Police Agency (Republic of China)
 Maritime industries of Taiwan

References

External links 

 ROC Coast Guard Administration Website 

 
2000 establishments in Taiwan
Government agencies established in 2000
Taiwanese intelligence agencies
Law enforcement agencies of Taiwan
Taiwan
Executive Yuan
Military of the Republic of China